Rhodoleptus comis is a species of longhorn beetle native to Honduras and Mexico. It was described by Henry Walter Bates in 1892.

References

Trachyderini
Beetles described in 1892